The 4th Aerobic Gymnastics World Championships were held in Catania, Italy from 15 to 16 May 1998.

Results

Women's Individual

Men's Individual

Mixed Pair

Trio

Medal table

References
FIG official site
UEG European Union of Gymnastics Statistics

Aerobic Gymnastics World Championships
Aerobic Gymnastics World Championships
Aerobic Gymnastics World Championships
Aerobic Gymnastics World Championships
International gymnastics competitions hosted by Italy